7255 aluminium alloy is a wrought alloy with high zinc weight percentage (from 7.8 to 8.4%). It also contains magnesium, copper.

Chemical composition

Properties

References

Aluminium alloy table 

Aluminium–zinc alloys